Siriporn Ampaipong (Alternative spelling: Siriporn Umpaipong; ; , birth name Sirima Amken; ;  ; born Monday December 7, 1964) is a mor lam and luk thung singer from the Isan region of Thailand.

Siriporn Ampaipong was born into a family of mor lam singers in Udon Thani Province. Most of her songs are sentimental ballads. She has released eight hit albums between 2001 and 2004, and is regarded as one of Thailand's most popular folk singers.

Discography

Original Albums

Special projects

References

Siriporn Ampaipong
1964 births
Living people
Siriporn Ampaipong
Siriporn Ampaipong
Siriporn Ampaipong